New Hope is an unincorporated community in Brown County, in the U.S. state of Ohio.

History
A post office called New Hope was established in 1828, and remained in operation until 1893. An outbreak of cholera in 1849 decimated the town's population.

References

Unincorporated communities in Brown County, Ohio
1828 establishments in Ohio
Populated places established in 1828
Unincorporated communities in Ohio